The Bailgu are an Aboriginal Australian people of the Pilbara region of Western Australia.

Country
Their northern extension ran as far as the Chichester Range scarp the Nullagine River divide. The eastern border ran to the western headwaters of the Oakover Davis rivers. Their neighbours further down the Fortescue were the Niabali. Their boundary with the Yindjibarndi lay at Mandanaladji.

History of contact
According to oral traditions handed down by the Bailgu, before the advent of the whites, they were dislocated from the salt marshs on the Fortescue river by pressure from the Panyjima tribe, which drove them further east. This narrative appears to be corroborated by the fact that among western tribes they were known as the Mangguldulkara(people of the marshes).

Notable people
Notable people with Bailgu heritage include:
 Ambelin Kwaymullina, author and academic
 Jill Milroy, indigenous studies educator
 Sally Morgan, author and artist

Alternative names
 Bailgo, Balgu, Palgu, Balju, Balgoo
 Bailko
 Baljgu, Balju
 Boolgoo
 Mangguldulkara. (exonym used of them by western tribes).
 Pailgu, Pailgo
 Pal'gu, Bailju
 Paljarri
 Pulgoe

Source: .

Notes

Citations

Sources

Aboriginal peoples of Western Australia